Perideridia kelloggii is a species of flowering plant in the family Apiaceae known by the common name Kellogg's yampah. It is endemic to California, where it is known from the north and central coasts, the San Francisco Bay Area, and the Sierra Nevada foothills. It grows in grassland habitat, sometimes on serpentine soils. It is a perennial herb which may reach 1.5 meters in maximum height, its slender, erect stem growing from a cluster of long, narrow, fibrous roots each up to 15 centimeters long. Leaves near the base of the plant have blades up to 45 centimeters wide which are divided into many leaflets subdivided into narrow, elongated lobes. The inflorescence is a compound umbel of many spherical clusters of small white flowers. These yield ribbed, oblong-shaped fruits each about half a centimeter long.

External links
 
 
Jepson Manual Treatment
USDA Plants Profile
Photo gallery

kelloggii
Endemic flora of California
Flora without expected TNC conservation status